Liagonum is a genus of ground beetles in the family Carabidae. There are more than 50 described species in Liagonum, most found in Africa.

Species
These 55 species belong to the genus Liagonum:

 Liagonum aereum (Coquerel, 1866)  (Madagascar)
 Liagonum analavelonae Basilewsky, 1985  (Madagascar)
 Liagonum anosyanum Basilewsky, 1985  (Madagascar)
 Liagonum arecarum (Coquerel, 1866)  (Reunion)
 Liagonum assimile Jeannel, 1948  (Madagascar)
 Liagonum baleense (Basilewsky, 1975)  (Ethiopia)
 Liagonum beckeri Jeannel, 1961  (the Lesser Antilles)
 Liagonum bicolor (Basilewsky, 1956)  (Democratic Republic of the Congo, Rwanda, and Uganda)
 Liagonum bintumanum Basilewsky, 1971  (Sierra Leone)
 Liagonum bosmansi Basilewsky, 1985  (Cameroon)
 Liagonum brachypterum Basilewsky, 1985  (Madagascar)
 Liagonum chappuisi (Burgeon, 1935)  (Kenya)
 Liagonum chenzemae Basilewsky, 1976  (Tanzania)
 Liagonum coquereli (Alluaud, 1897)  (the Comoro Islands and Madagascar)
 Liagonum curvipes Basilewsky, 1985  (Madagascar)
 Liagonum decellei Basilewsky, 1968  (Ivory Coast)
 Liagonum deplanatum Basilewsky, 1985  (Madagascar)
 Liagonum descarpentriesi (Basilewsky, 1967)  (Congo (Brazzaville))
 Liagonum florens Basilewsky, 1988  (South Africa)
 Liagonum fulvipes (LaFerté-Sénectère, 1853)  (worldwide)
 Liagonum grandidieri (Alluaud, 1897)  (Madagascar)
 Liagonum hova (Alluaud, 1897)  (Madagascar)
 Liagonum incertum Basilewsky, 1985  (Madagascar)
 Liagonum jeanneli (Alluaud, 1917)  (Tanzania)
 Liagonum kiymbiae (Basilewsky, 1960)  (Democratic Republic of the Congo)
 Liagonum laticolle Jeannel, 1948  (Madagascar)
 Liagonum lichenyanum Basilewsky, 1988  (Malawi)
 Liagonum mahafalyanum Basilewsky, 1985  (Madagascar)
 Liagonum mandibulare (Basilewsky, 1963)  (Guinea and Sierra Leone)
 Liagonum mangindranum Basilewsky, 1985  (Madagascar)
 Liagonum mantasoae Basilewsky, 1985  (Madagascar)
 Liagonum marakwetianum (Burgeon, 1935)  (Kenya)
 Liagonum marojejyanum Basilewsky, 1985  (Madagascar)
 Liagonum metrium (Alluaud, 1933)  (Mauritius)
 Liagonum monticola (Jeannel, 1951)  (Madagascar)
 Liagonum nebrioides Basilewsky, 1985  (Madagascar)
 Liagonum orophilum Basilewsky, 1985  (Madagascar)
 Liagonum pauliani Basilewsky, 1985  (Madagascar)
 Liagonum peyrierasi Basilewsky, 1985  (Madagascar)
 Liagonum ranomandryae Basilewsky, 1985  (Madagascar)
 Liagonum rhetoborum Basilewsky, 1985  (Madagascar)
 Liagonum scordiscum (Basilewsky, 1975)  (Ethiopia)
 Liagonum scotti Basilewsky, 1957  (Ethiopia)
 Liagonum sexpunctatum (Dejean, 1831)  (Reunion)
 Liagonum simplex (Alluaud, 1897)  (Madagascar)
 Liagonum solidum (Alluaud, 1897)  (Madagascar)
 Liagonum submimum (Basilewsky, 1963)  (Guinea)
 Liagonum subsolanum Jeannel, 1948  (Madagascar)
 Liagonum tsaratananae Basilewsky, 1985  (Madagascar)
 Liagonum ueleanum (Burgeon, 1933)  (Democratic Republic of the Congo)
 Liagonum vadoni Basilewsky, 1985  (Madagascar)
 Liagonum vakoanae (Jeannel, 1951)  (Madagascar)
 Liagonum vanderijsti (Burgeon, 1933)  (worldwide)
 Liagonum vicinum Jeannel, 1951  (Madagascar)
 Liagonum viettei Basilewsky, 1985  (Madagascar)

References

Platyninae